Riverina Water County Council is a body that provides drinking water to the City of Wagga Wagga, Greater Hume Shire, Lockhart Shire and part of Federation Council which operates under the provisions of the Local Government Act, 1993.

History
Southern Riverina County Council was formed in 1938 to supply reticulated water to towns in the Shires of Lockhart, Kyeamba, Mitchell and Culcairn with the Shires of Urana and Holbrook and the Municipality of Wagga Wagga became part of Southern Riverina County Council in 1945.

1942 to 1995 Southern Riverina County Council was responsible for electricity distribution in the Southern Riverina Area until Great Southern Energy was formed in 1995.

References

Wagga Wagga
 
Water companies of New South Wales
Lockhart Shire